The USA Final 1967 was the United Soccer Association's first, and only, postseason championship game. The Los Angeles Wolves (composed of players from England's Wolverhampton Wanderers defeated the Washington Whips (made up of members of Scotland's Aberdeen F.C.), 6 to 5, in a sudden-death overtime after 90 minutes of regular play and 30 minutes of extra time, with the win coming from an own goal credited against Washington's Ally Shewan.  The title game, a single-game match, took place on July 14, 1967, at the Los Angeles Memorial Coliseum before a crowd of only 17,482 people. The game was described as "the greatest final ever played in American soil".

At the end of regulation, Frank Munro of Washington had tied the game 4 to 4, and then tied it 5 to 5 in the final seconds of extra time.  Under the USA rules for playoff games, the winner would be the first team to score if the match was still tied after 120 minutes.  Six minutes into overtime, Bobby Thomson of Los Angeles was attempting to pass toward the Washington goal, and his shot rebounded off of Shewan's thigh and into the goal that had been left open by Washington goalie Bobby Clark; the Wolves flew back to England two days later.

Background
A coin flip held on June 27 determined which division champion (Eastern or Western) would host the championship final. The Washington Whips won the Eastern Division with 5 wins, 5 draws and 2 losses for 15 total points. The Los Angeles Wolves won the Western Division, also with 5 wins, 5 draws and 2 losses for 15 points. As division champions, both teams earned the right to compete in the inaugural title game. Although Washington held a slight advantage in goal differential, a coin flip was used to decide that the Western Division winner would be the home side for the final.

Match details 

 

1967 USA Champions: Los Angeles Wolves

References

External links
 

1967a
1
1967a
July 1967 sports events in the United States
1967 in sports in California
Soccer in California